The Rizhsky suburban railway line is one of eleven suburban railway lines used for connections between Moscow, Russia, and surrounding areas, mostly in Moscow Oblast. The Rizhsky suburban railway line connects Moscow with the station in the northwest, in particular, with the towns of Krasnogorsk, Dedovsk, Istra, and Volokolamsk. The stations the line serves are located in Moscow, as well as in the towns of Krasnogorsk, Istra, Volokolamsk, and the urban-type settlement of Shakhovskaya in Moscow Oblast. Some of the suburban trains have their southeastern terminus at Streshnevo and Moscow Rizhsky railway station in Moscow, others commute from the Kursky suburban railway line. In the northwestern direction, the suburban trains terminate at Nakhabino, Dedovsk, Novoiyerusalimskaya, Rumyantsevo, Volokolamsk, and Shakhovskaya. The suburban railway line is served by the Moscow Railway subsidiary of Russian Railways with the join stock of CSPC. The tracks between Moscow Rizhsky railway station and Nakhabino are also used by Line D2, one of the Moscow Central Diameters.

The suburban railway line follows the railway which connects Moscow with Riga via Rzhev and Velikiye Luki. It is electrified between Moscow and Shakhovskaya. Between Moscow and Volokolamsk, there are two tracks, west of Volokolamsk there is one track.

History
The construction of the railway between Moscow and Vindava (Moscow–Vindava Railway) started in 1897. On June 30, 1901, the passenger traffic between Moscow and Volokolamsk was opened. Vindavsky railway station, currently Rizhsky railway station, was opened on September 11, 1901.  The railway had only one track; the construction of the second track between Moscow and Volokolamsk only started in the 1950s.

In 1945, the section between Moscow and Nakhabino was electrified. It was used by seventeen suburban trains per day in each direction. One of these trains continued to Lyublino, and sixteen others terminated at Rizhsky railway station. In 1954, the section to Guchkovo (currently Dedovsk) was electrified, and in 1955, the section to Novoiyerusalimskaya was electrified. In 1959, the line was transferred to Moscow Railway. In 1959, the electrification to Volokolamsk was completed, and for a long time Volokolamsk served as the end station of the line. The traffic between Volokolamsk and Rzhev was performed by steam engine-led trains, later by diesel trains. In 1990, direct trains from Moscow to Shakhovskaya were launched, but the section between Volokolamsk and Shakhovskaya was only electrified by 1991, so that the trains between 1990 and 1991 were pulled by a diesel locomotive between Volokolamsk and Shakhovskaya.

In the 1930s, a side one-track stretch between Nakhabino and Pavlovskaya Sloboda  was built. Although there was no direct connection between Moscow and Pavlovskaya Sloboda, it was served by the same locomotives as the main direction. In 1964 the section was electrified. In the 1990s, the military installations in Pavlovskaya Sloboda were disestablished, and the number of passengers dropped. Following the general trend, the Russian Railways decided to close down the branch. It was closed down in 1996 and subsequently demolished.

In 2018 old Leningradskaya station was closed because of moving of the platform to the west towards Streshnevo station of the Moscow Central Circle. The new station was open on 1 October 2018, and on 12 June 2019 the interchange between Streshnevo and Leningradskaya (later renamed Streshnevo) started operation.

On 21 November 2019 Moscow Central Diameters started operation. Subsequently, Tushino, Leningradskaya, and Rzhevskaya were renamed to Tushinskaya, Streshnevo, and Rizhskaya to have common names with metro stations located close to them. On 25 June 2021, Pokrovskoye-Streshnevo was closed, and Shchukinskaya was opened.

Stations
Following the standard notations in Russia, a railway stop is called a station if it is a terminus or if it handles freight, and is called a platform otherwise.

References

Rail transport in Moscow
Rail transport in Moscow Oblast
Moscow Railway